Tiago Geronimi (born November 27, 1988 in Lorena) is a Brazilian racing driver. He has competed in such series as Formula BMW ADAC/Europe and Formula Three Euroseries.

References

External links
 Official website
 

1988 births
Living people
Brazilian racing drivers
Brazilian people of Italian descent
Sportspeople from São Paulo (state)
Formula BMW ADAC drivers
Formula BMW Europe drivers
Formula 3 Euro Series drivers

Eifelland Racing drivers
Signature Team drivers
People from Lorena, São Paulo